O'Connor Nunataks is a group of rock exposures rising above the ice near the head of Balchen Glacier, 5 nautical miles (9 km) northeast of Griffith Nunataks in the Ford Ranges, Marie Byrd Land. Discovered by the United States Antarctic Service (USAS) in aerial flights over this area in 1940, and named for Raymond O'Connor, a member of the West Base of the USAS (1939–41).

Nunataks of Marie Byrd Land